Chesnutt is a surname. Notable people with the surname include:

Charles W. Chesnutt (1858–1932), American author, essayist, political activist and lawyer
Cody Chesnutt (born 1968), American R&B and neo soul musician from Atlanta, Georgia
Mark Chesnutt (born 1963), American country music singer
Vic Chesnutt (1964–2009), American singer-songwriter from Athens, Georgia

See also
Chesnut
Anne Chesnutt Middle School, year-round middle school, part of Cumberland County Schools in Fayetteville, North Carolina
CESNET
Chess-Nuts
Chestnut